The Okanagan Game Farm was a private zoo located in Kaleden, British Columbia, a small community approximately  south of Penticton, British Columbia. The park closed on March 31, 1999, after 33 years in operation.

History
The Okanagan Game Farm opened on June 22, 1967, after a group of thirty shareholders agreed to invest $200,000 in the Farm on 270 hectares of land leased from the Penticton Indian Band in the small community of Kaleden, British Columbia.

At one time, the Okanagan Game Farm had over 130 species of animals, with a head count of over 1,200. The species included Siberian tigers, rhinos, giraffes, bears, wolves, bighorn sheep and numerous reptiles and birds. The Farm closed on March 31, 1999.

References

Zoos in British Columbia
Former zoos
Tourist attractions in the Okanagan
Zoos established in 1967
Zoos disestablished in 1999
1967 establishments in British Columbia
1999 disestablishments in British Columbia